Seidu Issifu is a Ghanaian former professional footballer who is last known to have played for Terengganu FA of the Malaysia Super League in 2002.

Malaysia

Keen to return to Terengganu FA for the 2002 season, Issifu was officially traded to the club in mid-January that year, even though they were enmeshed in financial difficulties. In 2003, the Ghanaian midfielder suffered an injury, causing him to miss some games including one facing Sabah.

References

External links 
 Ghanaweb Profile

Ghanaian expatriate footballers
Living people
Ghanaian footballers
Expatriate footballers in Qatar
Association football midfielders
Expatriate footballers in Malaysia
Terengganu FC players
Year of birth missing (living people)